Gulngai is a rural locality in the Cassowary Coast Region, Queensland, Australia.

Gulngai's postcode is 4855.

Geography 
The locality is bounded by the ridgeline of the Walter Hill Range (midpoint ) to the south-west. The ridgeline forms a drainage divide with the creeks rising on the range within Gulngai contributing to the Johnstone River basin which enters the Coral Sea between Flying Fish Point and Coquette Point. There are two named peaks on the ridgeline:

The entire locality is a protected area with the north of the locality within the Wooroonooran National Park and the south of the locality within the Japoon National Park.

There is only one road in the locality, Sutties Gap Road, which passes through the north-western corner of the locality, entering from Mamu to the north and exiting to Koombooloomba / Palmerston in the north-west.

History 
The Walter Hill Range was named by explorer George Elphinstone Dalrymple on 7 October 1873, after botanist Walter Hill, a member of Dalyrmple's 1873 expedition from Cardwell to the Endeavour River and the first curator of the Brisbane City Botanic Gardens.

The locality was officially named and bounded on 21 January 2000.

References 

Cassowary Coast Region
Localities in Queensland